PBJ or PB&J is a peanut butter and jelly sandwich, popular in North America.

PBJ or PB&J may also refer to:
 PBJ (TV network), a children's television network in the United States
 PB&J Television
 PBJ-1, US Navy variant of the B-25 Mitchell bomber
PB&J Otter, kid's program
PBJ or PB&J may abbreviate for:
 Peanut Butter Jelly (song)
Peanut Butter Jelly Time, song
 Probation before judgment In Maryland, deferred adjudication is called "Probation Before Judgment" or "PBJ" for short. 
 Progressive Black & Journalists, an African-American journalism organization
 Peter Bjorn and John, a Swedish indie pop band
 Patrick Baldwin Jr., an American basketball player for the Golden State Warriors

See also

 or 
 or